Daniel Scherwin Koltun (1933–2014) was an American theoretical physicist, specializing in nuclear physics.

Koltun graduated in 1955 from Harvard University with a bachelor's degree and in 1961 from Princeton University with a Ph.D. in physics with thesis New methods of spectroscopy applied to the nuclear 1-p shell. He became in 1962 a member of the University of Rochester's physics faculty and retired there in 2004 as professor emeritus.

He was a visiting staff member at Los Alamos Meson Physics Facility over a span of 18 years and served on the Facility's Program Advisory Committee. He was a visiting fellow at the Weizmann Institute of Science and at the Niels Bohr Institute. He was a visiting professor from 1976 to 1977 at Tel Aviv University and in 1985 at the Hebrew University of Jerusalem.

Koltun held an Alfred P. Sloan Research Fellowship from 1969 to 1971 and was elected a Fellow of the American Physical Society in 1972.

Upon his death he was survived by his widow, two children, and four grandchildren. The University of Rochester's flag (with the motto Meliora, located on the Eastman Quadrangle) was flown at half-staff in his memory.

Selected publications
 with Judah M. Eisenberg: 
 with Judah M. Eisenberg:

References

American nuclear physicists
Harvard University alumni
Princeton University alumni
University of Rochester faculty
Fellows of the American Physical Society
1933 births
2014 deaths